The 1990 Tampa Bay Buccaneers season was the franchise's 15th season in the National Football League.

Head coach Ray Perkins and Bucs players were getting criticized by fans with his 3-a-day training camp practices. Leaving many players complaining of fatigue late in the year, and with injuries that never really healed themselves throughout the end of the season.

Still, after starting 4–2 via four wins against divisional opponents, the Buccaneers dropped two out of three games to a weak Dallas Cowboys team.  Later in the year, quarterback Vinny Testaverde and receiver Willie Drewrey combined on an 89-yard touchdown pass in week 13 for the longest play in franchise history. Coach Perkins was fired after that game and the team fell short of a possible break even season with two losses to end the season, although the 6-10 record was Tampa Bay's best since 1984, John McKay's last season as coach. 

Offensive coordinator Richard Williamson was made head coach for the 1991 season based on a 1–2 record. Tax records showed the Buccaneers were one of the most profitable teams during this time, even though owner Hugh Culverhouse announced the Bucs were losing money and needed to play games in Orlando, Florida to gain income.

The Buccaneers officially finished second in the NFC Central thanks to their 5-3 divisional record. The other three teams in the division who went 6-10--the Lions, Packers and Vikings--all went 3-5 in division games. The second place finish was their highest since winning the division in 1981, and would be their highest until 1997.

Offseason

NFL draft

Roster

Regular season

Schedule

Notes:
Division opponents in bold text

Standings

References 

 Buccaneers on Pro Football Reference

Tampa Bay Buccaneers season
Tampa Bay Buccaneers
20th century in Tampa, Florida
Tampa Bay Buccaneers seasons